Community reinforcement approach and family training (CRAFT) is a behavior therapy approach in psychotherapy for treating addiction developed by Robert J. Meyers in the late 1970s. Meyers worked with Nathan Azrin in the early 1970s whilst he was developing his own community reinforcement approach (CRA) which uses operant conditioning (also called contingency management) techniques to help people learn to reduce the power of their addictions and enjoy healthy living. Meyers adapted CRA to create CRAFT, which he described as CRA that "works through family members." CRAFT combines CRA with family training to equip concerned significant others (CSOs) of addicts with supportive techniques to encourage their loved ones to begin and continue treatment and provides them with defences against addiction's damaging effects on themselves.

Overview 

"CRA is a time-limited treatment." "In time-limited therapy, a set number of sessions (for example, 16 sessions) or time limit (for example, one year) is decided upon either at the very beginning of therapy or within the early stages of therapy."

Community reinforcement and family training (CRAFT) is CRA that "works through family members." It "is designed to increase the odds of the substance user who is refusing treatment to enter treatment, as well as improve the lives of the concerned family members. CRAFT "teaches the use of healthy rewards to encourage positive behaviors. Plus, it focuses on helping both the substance user and the family."

Adolescent Community Reinforcement Approach (A-CRA) is CRA that "targets adolescents with substance use problems and their caregivers."

Description 
CRAFT is a motivational model of family therapy. It is reward-based—that is, based on positive reinforcement. CRAFT is aimed at the families and friends of treatment-refusing individuals who have a substance use disorder. "CRAFT works to affect [influence] the substance users' behavior by changing the way the family interacts with them."

"CRAFT grew out of the understanding that although individuals who truly need help with substance use problems often are strongly opposed to treatment. On the other hand, the concerned significant others (CSOs) of the people who use substances are commonly highly motivated to get help for them."

In the model, the following key terms are used:

 Identified Patient (IP) – the individual with the substance use disorder who is refusing treatment, 
 Concerned Significant Others (CSOs) – the relevant family members and friends of the IP.

Three goals 

When a loved one is abusing substances and refusing to get help, CRAFT is designed to help families learn practical and effective ways to accomplish three goals:

 Move their loved one toward treatment,
 Reduce their loved one's alcohol and drug use
 Simultaneously improve their own lives.

Family influence 

Robert J. Meyers, PhD wrote about the influence that concerned family members have in treatment of the substance user, and the benefits for themselves:

CRA procedures 
The following CRA procedures and descriptions are from Meyers, Roozen, and Smith for the substance user:

 Functional Analysis of Substance
 Explore the antecedents of a client's substance use.
 Explore the positive and negative consequences of a client's substance use.
 Sobriety Sampling
 A gentle movement toward long-term abstinence that begins with a client's agreement to sample a time-limited period of abstinence.
 CRA Treatment Plan
 Establish meaningful, objective goals in client-selected areas.
 Establish highly specified methods for obtaining those goals.
 Tools: Happiness Scale, and Goals of Counseling form.
 Behavior Skills Training
 Teach three basic skills through instruction and role-playing:
 Problem-solving
 Break overwhelming problems into smaller ones.
 Address smaller problems.
 Communication skills
 A positive interaction style
 Drink/drug refusal training
 Identify high-risk situations.
 Teach assertiveness.
 Job Skills Training
 Provide basic steps for obtaining and keeping a valued job.
 Social and Recreational Counseling
 Provide opportunities to sample new social and recreational activities.
 Relapse Prevention
 Teach clients how to identify high-risk situations.
 Teach clients how to anticipate and cope with a relapse.
 Relationship Counseling
 Improve the interaction between the client and his or her partner.

Communication 

With CRAFT, families/friends (CSOs) are trained in various strategies, including positive reinforcement, various communication skills, and natural consequences. "One of the big pieces that has a lot of influence over all the other strategies is positive communication. "There are seven steps in the CRAFT model for implementing positive communication strategies."

 Be Brief
 Be Positive
 Refer to Specific Behaviors
 Label your Feelings
 Offer an Understanding Statement – For example, "I appreciate that you have these concerns, ... [or] I understand that you really want to talk right now, and that this feels urgent, ... [or] I would love to be there for you."
 Accept Partial Responsibility – This step "is really designed to decrease defensiveness on the part of your loved one. ... It's not about accepting responsibility for things you are not responsible for. ... [Rather, it's to] direct you towards the piece that you can own for yourself. ... [For example, ] what you can take responsibility for are the ways that you communicate," etc.
 Offer to Help

"The overarching goals for the strategies for communicating are to help decrease defensiveness on the part of the loved one that you are speaking to, and increase the chances that your message is really going to be heard—so, increasing the ability that you have to really get across the message that you want." In fact, the title of Robert J. Meyers' and Brenda L. Wolfe's book based on CRAFT is, Get Your Loved One Sober: Alternatives to Nagging, Pleading, and Threatening.

"Consequences being in place is really important and helpful in terms of communicating your message, but it's also really important, maybe even more so, to be consistent in following through with those consequences and rewards."

CRAFT view 

Although the majority of medical and legal professional bodies such as the World Health Organization, American Medical Association and the American Bar Association all state that alcoholism is a disease that is demonstrated by brain abnormalities, contrary assessments exist. Dr. Gene Heyman and others assert alcoholism is not a progressive, incurable disease. See disease theory of alcoholism for a full discussion. The diagnostic assessment of alcoholism in someone can include an assessment of co-morbidity with conditions such as mental illness, and domestic violence.

From SMART Recovery, section: Family & Friends:

The CRAFT program uses a variety of interventions based on functional assessment including a module to prevent domestic violence.

Intervention 
"There are questions about the long-term effectiveness of interventions for those addicted to drugs or alcohol.  A study examining addicts who had undergone a classic intervention, known as the Johnson Intervention, found that they had a higher relapse rate than any other method of referral to outpatient Alcohol and Other Drug treatment".

Smith, Campos-Melady and Meyers describe the Johnson intervention as uncomfortable for many CSOs: “The Al-Anon approach's emphasis upon detaching from the substance abuser is unappealing to many CSOs. On the other end of the spectrum is the Johnson Institute Intervention: a "surprise party" in which the IP is confronted by family members and a therapist with the objective of getting the IP to enter treatment. When the intervention is actually carried out, it often results in a high rate of engagement in treatment, and yet only a small number of CSOs who begin the program ever follow through with the intervention (Liepman, Nirenberg, & Begin, 1989; Miller et al., 1999), and many report feeling uncomfortable with its confrontational nature” (Barber & Gilbertson, 1997).

Research suggests that CRAFT has had significantly greater success than the Johnson Intervention method or Al-Anon/Alateen, as far as engaging loved ones in treatment.

Development of CRAFT
Robert J. Meyers, the psychologist who developed the CRAFT approach to alcoholism, wrote in an introduction to one of his books that "although my mother was blessed by the support and comfort she found in Al-Anon meetings, she was never able to achieve her most cherished goals of getting my father into treatment and getting him to stay sober". Witnessing this as a child inspired Meyer to seek an approach that was more effective for people with those goals. The origin of CRAFT:

“Drs. Robert J. Meyers and Jane Ellen Smith of the University of New Mexico developed the CRAFT program to teach families how to impact their loved one while avoiding both detachment and confrontation, the respective strategies of Al-Anon (a 12-Step based approach), and traditional (Johnson Institute-style) interventions in which the substance user is confronted by family members and friends during a surprise meeting. While all three approaches have been found to improve family members' functioning and relationship satisfaction, CRAFT has proven to be significantly more effective in engaging loved ones in comparison to the Johnson Institute Intervention or Al-Anon/Nar-Anon facilitation therapy.”

Having worked with Nathan Azrin in the early 1970s whilst Azrin was developing the community reinforcement approach, Meyers started to look into using the process in other settings. CRAFT combines CRA with family training, which equips the families and friends of addicts with supportive techniques to encourage their loved ones to begin and continue treatment and provides them with defences against addiction's damaging effects on loved ones.

CRA 
The community reinforcement approach was developed by Nathan Azrin in the early 1970s and has considerable research supporting its effectiveness in working with addicts.

The community reinforcement approach (CRA) was "originally developed for individuals with alcohol use disorders, [but] has been successfully employed to treat a variety of substance use disorders for more than 35 years. Based on operant conditioning [a type of learning], CRA helps people rearrange their lifestyles so that healthy, drug-free living becomes rewarding and thereby competes with alcohol and drug use."

CRA was designed by Nate Azrin in the early 1970s: “The most influential behaviorist of all times, B. F. Skinner, largely considered punishment to be an ineffective method for modifying human behavior (Skinner 1974). Thus it was no surprise that, many years later, research discovered that substance use disorder treatments based on confrontation were largely ineffective in decreasing the use of alcohol and other substances (Miller and Wilbourne 2002, Miller et al. 1998). Nate Azrin already was convinced of this back in the early 1970s, when he designed an innovative treatment for alcohol problems: the Community Reinforcement Approach (CRA). Azrin believed that it was necessary to alter the environment in which people with alcohol problems live so that they received strong reinforcement for sober behavior from their community, including family, work, and friends. As part of this strategy, the program emphasizes helping clients discover new, enjoyable activities that do not revolve around alcohol, and teaching them the skills necessary for participating in those activities.”

Community reinforcement has both efficacy and effectiveness data. Started in the 1970s, community reinforcement approach is a comprehensive program using operant conditioning based on a functional assessment of a client's drinking behavior and the use of positive reinforcement and contingency management to achieve a goal of non-drinking. When combined with disulfiram (a prescribed substance acting as Aversion therapy) community reinforcement was particularly effective. A notable component of the program is the non-drinking club. As of 2007, applications of community reinforcement to public policy has become a focus of study.

"The Community Reinforcement Approach has also been found to be effective in outpatient setting. In one study, clients treated with CRA and the disulfiram compliance component were abstinent an average of 97% of the days during the last month of the 6-month followup, whereas clients treated with a combination of a 12-step program and the CRA disulfiram compliance training were
abstinent an average of 74% of the days. For those clients who received a 12-step program and a prescription for disulfiram, an average of only 45% of the comparable days were abstinent (Azrin, Sisson, Meyers, & Godley, 1982)."

Recent developments

As of 2009, CRAFT and CRA programs were not widespread amongst addiction counselors. The adoption of evidence-based treatments have been slow. Instead, many addiction counselors were tied to a twelve-step model with less research support. The National Institute on Drug Abuse (NIDA), a federally funded organisation aiding scientific research into addiction has supported CRAFT intervention techniques among others. In 2007, CRAFT was being used in 25 clinics in the United States.

However CRAFT has been adopted by a number of commercial and self-help organisations in the United States. Meyers and the Treatment Research Institute (TRI) worked with Cadence Online to create a ParentCRAFT course where parents pay a one-off fee for a series of videos presenting the CRAFT process, aimed at teaching them skills to meet the risks of substance use in their adolescent children. An undisclosed “major share”  of the revenues goes to TRI. Meyer’s work was partially funded with a grant from NIDA Allies in Recovery provides a series of videos, eBook, blog, live calls and other services to families of addicts based on CRAFT methods for an annual fee. As of 2020, the State of Massachusetts is providing free access for all its residents to the AIR service.  Based in Rhode Island, Resources Education Support Together (REST) is a peer-led mutual aid group that uses CRAFT and the Allies in Recovery service for its members.

Research and outcomes

CRAFT compared with other approaches

An offshoot of the community reinforcement approach is the community reinforcement approach and family training. This program is designed to help family members of people who use substances feel empowered to engage in treatment. Community reinforcement approach and family training (CRAFT) has helped family members to get their loved ones into treatment. The rates of success have varied somewhat by study but seem to cluster around 70%. CRAFT is one of the only family-aimed treatments with proven results for getting people with drug or alcohol problems into treatment. The program uses a variety of interventions based on functional assessment including a module to prevent domestic violence. Partners are trained to use positive reinforcement, various communication skills and natural consequences.

Intervention for Alcohol Use 

From an article on the American Psychological Association (APA) website about the success of CRAFT in substance use treatment and intervention, these are the success outcomes for engaging drinkers into treatment:

 64% – CRAFT
 23% – Johnson Intervention
 13% – Twelve-Step Facilitation (TSF)

Elsewhere Robert Meyers has clarified that Twelve-Step Facilitation used in the Miller et al’s comparative study of 130 caretakers of problem drinkers was a control group structured to “simulate the kind of care and guidance CSO’s would traditionally receive from attending Al-Anon meetings... treatments were delivered one-on-one and included up to 12 hours of therapy.”

Comparisons 

One experiment compared the two psychotherapy approaches of CRAFT and Twelve-step facilitation therapies (TFT), (not to be confused with the 12-Step programs such as Al-Anon since TFT is a time-limited program intended to "simulate the type of support and guidance... traditionally receive[d] from attending Al-Anon meetings" ) for their impacts on addicts seeking to enter treatment. The finding was that concerned significant others who participated in facilitation therapy engaged 29.0% of addicts into treatment, whereas those who went through CRAFT engaged 67.2%. Another study compared CRAFT, Al-Anon facilitation therapy and a Johnson intervention. The study found that all of these approaches were associated with similar improvements in the functioning of concerned significant others and improvements in their relationship quality with the addicts. However, the CRAFT approach was more effective in engaging initially unmotivated problem drinkers in treatment (64%) as compared with the facilitation therapy (13%) and Johnson interventions (30%).

Intervention for Substance use 

From the same article on the American Psychological Association (APA) website about the success of CRAFT in substance use treatment and intervention, these are the success outcomes for persons abusing drugs to enter treatment (the success outcomes were nearly the same as the alcohol use disorder outcomes):

 64% – CRAFT
 17% – Caregivers' Twelve-step Group (TSG)

From the article:

Note: When the articles states "there was no group x time interaction," it simply means the CRAFT outcome (64%) and the TSF outcome (17%) remained the same over time, even though there was a reduction in drug use during the study.

Parallel study 
"In a parallel study sponsored by the National Institute on Drug Abuse that focused on people who use other substances, family members receiving CRAFT successfully engaged 74 percent of initially unmotivated drug users in treatment (Meyers et al. 1999)."

Professional organizations 
CRAFT is a model of clinical behavior analysis which is of interest to the following professional organisations.

The Association for Behavior Analysis International (ABAI) has a special interest group in clinical behavior analysis.
The Association for Behavioral and Cognitive Therapies (ABCT) also has an interest group in behavior analysis, which focuses on clinical behavior analysis. In addition, ABCT has a special interest group on addictions.

See also 

 Al-Anon/Alateen
 American Psychological Association
 Behaviorism
 Clinical behavior analysis
 Cognitive behavioral therapy
 Communal reinforcement
 Domestic violence
 Intervention (counseling)
 National Institute on Alcohol Abuse and Alcoholism
 National Institute on Drug Abuse
 SMART Recovery

References

External links 
 Adapting the CRAFT approach for use in group therapy
 Parent CRAFT – Online Video Course developed by Robert J. Meyers, PhD
 Community Reinforcement Approach at Drug & Alcohol Rehab Asia (DARA),  Thailand
 Community Reinforcement Approach and Family Training (CRAFT) at the American Psychological Association
 The Community Reinforcement Approach: An Update of the Evidence at the NIAAA
 Robert J. Meyers personal website
 SMART Recovery Family & Friends
 Step Facilitation Therapy Manual

Addiction
Addiction medicine
Behavior therapy
Drug rehabilitation
Twelve-step programs